Echeveria pulidonis is a species of flowering plant in the family Crassulaceae, native to central Mexico, more specifically, Puebla and Veracruz.

Description
Habit: Forms rosettes of leaves, and as it ages, it will naturally form offsets, creating clusters of rosettes. Each rosette can reach 13–15 cm in diameter.

Leaves: Tapered to a sharp point. Green with red margins.

Flowers: Yellow.

Cultivation
Half-hardy. Dislikes water sitting on its leaves, but tolerates this more than some other Echeveria species do.

Taxonomy 
Echeveria is named for Atanasio Echeverría y Godoy, a botanical illustrator who contributed to Flora Mexicana.

References

External links
 

pulidonis